Jaime Salazar Gutiérrez (6 February 1931-14 Mar 2011) was a Mexican professional football midfielder who played for Mexico in the 1958 FIFA World Cup. He also played for Club Necaxa.

References

External links
FIFA profile

1931 births
Mexican footballers
Mexico international footballers
Association football midfielders
Club Necaxa footballers
1958 FIFA World Cup players
2011 deaths